Mikaela Uthas  (born 7 June 1992) is a Swedish football defender who currently plays for Hovås Billdal IF in the Elitettan. She has previously played for Djurgårdens IF and at the Damallsvenskan for Jitex BK.

References

Swedish women's footballers
Jitex BK players
Djurgårdens IF Fotboll (women) players
Damallsvenskan players
1992 births
Living people
Women's association football defenders